Byron High School is located in the small city of Byron, Illinois population: 3,284. Byron High School is located 17 miles southwest from Rockford, Illinois, the state's third largest city.

Revenue
Taxes from the Byron Nuclear Generating Station play a critical role in the school's funding. In 2006 Byron passed a referendum that raised property taxes in order to build a new middle school and add a new wing onto Byron High School. The new Byron High School wing was completed in winter 2007. The new Byron Middle School, completed as of summer 2009, is currently in use.

Colors and Mascot
The Byron school colors are orange, black and white. The school mascot is the tiger.

Activities
Byron High school offers several sports and extra curricular activities for its student body. Non-athletic activities include: Chess, Scholastic Bowl, Speech Team, Drama Club, Worldwide Youth in Science and Engineering, National Honor Society, Foreign Language Club, Future Farmers of America, Band, Chorus, Art Club, Student Council, Yearbook, Mission Statement Club, and Key Club.

The Byron Scholastic Bowl qualified for the State Finals eight times (twice in combined field, six times in Class A), winning the Class A State Championship in 2000 and placing second in 1997, 2008, and 2018. The WYSE Team also captured two state championships in 2015 and 2017.

Athletics
Byron High School competes in the Big Northern Conference. Athletic activities include: Basketball, Volleyball, Track, Cross Country, Football, Golf, Softball, Baseball, Swimming, Bowling and Soccer.

Byron's Football team won the Class 3A state championship in 1999, finishing with a record of 14-0. The team set the state's single-season scoring record by scoring a total of 673 points. That record has since been surpassed. Byron’s Football team reached the IHSA Class 3A state championship game in back to back years in 2018 and 2019, losing both times by 4 points. Byron also won the Class 3A state championship game in 2021.

The Byron High School Wrestling team won the 1994-95 Illinois Class A state championship with a record of 22-2. The team also finished as the state runner-up in the 1998-99 season with a record of 23-3.

Byron's Boys' Golf team won the state title in 2007, 2015, and 2016.

Officers
The current Superintendent is Buster Barton.

Other superintendents have included Margaret Fostiak, who was terminated by the Byron School Board in 2011. Dr. James Hammack followed Dr. Fostiak as Superintendent until the Spring of 2018.

The current Board of Education is listed on the District 226 webpage.

The principal of Byron High School is Jay Mullens.

Notable alumni
Troy Drake - Philadelphia Eagles
Sean Considine - Baltimore Ravens

References

External links
Byron Home Page

Public high schools in Illinois
Byron, Illinois
Schools in Ogle County, Illinois